Ferdinand Croy (born 23 June 1940) is an Austrian equestrian. He competed in two events at the 1972 Summer Olympics.

References

1940 births
Living people
Austrian male equestrians
Olympic equestrians of Austria
Equestrians at the 1972 Summer Olympics
Place of birth missing (living people)